Harpactor angulosus is a species of true bug (Harpactorinae). This assassin bug has been documented preying on caterpillars of the genus Hylesia (Lepidoptera: Saturniidae: Hemileucinae) in Viçosa, Minas Gerais State, Brazil.  Caterpillars of this genus are an agricultural pest. H. angulosus, like other species of Harpactorini, has potential as a biological pest control agent.

References

Reduviidae
Hemiptera of South America
Insects described in 1825